Whitley's toadfish (Torquigener whitleyi) is a species of fish in the family Tetraodontidae that reaches a length of 9.8 cm, and is a host to Bianium plicitum.

Distribution, habitat, and feeding 
It lives in the Indo-West Pacific, from northern Australia to Papua New Guinea. It lives at depths from 0 to 50 meters  near coastal waters in sandy-bottom substrates with no vegetation, and feeds on molluscs and crustaceans in the areas it inhabits.

Conservation 
Its population is unknown, yet it occurs in marine protected areas, and has no specific threats to it, and the IUCN Red List puts it at "least concern".

References 

Fish described in 1927
Tetraodontidae
Fish of Australia
Fish of Indonesia